All Progressive Youth Association (TÜM-İGD) is a socialist youth organisation in Turkey.

External links
 İlerici Gençlik official web site of the association's magazine.

Youth wings of political parties in Turkey
Youth wings of communist parties